Hamzah Saleh (born April 19, 1967) is a former Saudi Arabian footballer who played as a midfielder.

He played for Al-Ahli and represented the national team at the 1994 and 1998 FIFA World Cups.

References

External links

1967 births
Living people
People from Medina
Saudi Arabian footballers
Saudi Arabia international footballers
Association football midfielders
1992 King Fahd Cup players
1994 FIFA World Cup players
1995 King Fahd Cup players
1996 AFC Asian Cup players
1997 FIFA Confederations Cup players
1998 FIFA World Cup players
AFC Asian Cup-winning players
Al-Ahli Saudi FC players
Al-Ansar FC (Medina) players
Ohod Club players
Saudi First Division League players
Saudi Professional League players
Naturalised citizens of Saudi Arabia